The Dutch National Track Championships – Women's points race is the Dutch national championship points race event held annually at the Dutch National Track Championships. The event was first held in 1989.

Medalists

Results from cyclebase.nl and cyclingarchives.com.

Multiple champions
6 times champion:  Ingrid Haringa 
5 times champion:  Leontien Zijlaard-van Moorsel
4 times champion:  Adrie Visser
2 times champion:  Kirsten Wild

References

 
Dutch National track cycling championships
Women's points race